Julius Eskesen (born 16 March 1999) is a Danish footballer who plays as a winger or midfielder for Haugesund in the Eliteserien.

Youth career
Eskesen joined OB at the age of 10 from B1913 in Odense. On his 15-year birthday, Eskesen signed his first contract with OB. In 2016, Eskesen suffered from an injury, and was operated for it. Already at the age of 17, had he been on a trial at Spanish club Málaga CF.

Club career

OB
Already at the age of 17, Eskesen got invited to a first team training camp in Spain. On 20 June 2017, Eskesen signed his first professional contract. The contract, which was valid until the summer 2021, also secured him a promotion to the first team squad.

Eskesen got his debut for OB on 29 August 2017. He started on the bench, but replaced Nana Welbeck in the 65th minute and scored the winning goal in a 1-0 victory against Dalum IF in the Danish Cup.

SønderjyskE
On 28 January 2020, Eskesen joined SønderjyskE on a deal until the summer 2024. He made 67 official appearances and scored two goals for SønderjyskE during his time at the club.

Haugesund
On 31 March 2022, Eskesen moved to Norway, where he signed a four-year deal with Haugesund. He got his debut for Haugesund on 18 April 2022 against Strømsgodset.

Honours
SønderjyskE
Danish Cup: 2019–20

References

External links
 
 Julius Eskesen at DBU 

1999 births
Living people
Danish men's footballers
Danish expatriate men's footballers
Association football midfielders
Footballers from Odense
Boldklubben 1913 players
Odense Boldklub players
SønderjyskE Fodbold players
FK Haugesund players
Danish Superliga players
Eliteserien players
Danish expatriate sportspeople in Norway
Expatriate footballers in Norway